Mobi, Inc. is a wireless carrier founded in 2004 and based in Honolulu.  The company provides service on each of the major islands of Hawaiʻi.  The company is a member of the Competitive Carriers Association and the Pacific Telecommunications Council.

History

The company acquired wireless spectrum in the PCS band in 2004 and launched service covering Hawaiʻi in 2005.

The company, then doing business as Mobi PCS, along with Metro PCS, was backed by venture capital firm M/C Partners, with both disrupting the market in their respective regions by offering no contract, no credit check, unlimited wireless service long before those became widespread options in the wireless industry.  By 2008, Mobi had opened eleven retail and seventy dealer locations throughout Hawaiʻi.

While the company launched with CDMA service (along with other members of the Associated Carrier Group), it later transitioned to offering LTE and 5G wireless services.

Labor relations

In 2022, its frontline and digital workers in Hawaiʻi, on the mainland United States, in Canada, and in México unionized with the Communications Workers of America, which the company voluntarily recognized despite the common trend of union busting in its industry.

References

External links
mobi.com

Mobi on LinkedIn

Mobile phone companies of the United States
Telecommunications companies established in 2004
2004 establishments in Hawaii
Companies based in Honolulu